Crawford is a subzone within the planning area of Kallang, Singapore, as defined by the Urban Redevelopment Authority (URA). Its perimeter is made up of Rochor River and Rochor Canal in the north; Crawford Street, Nicoll Highway, Kallang Basin and Marina Channel in the east; East Coast Parkway (ECP) in the south; as well as Ophir Road, Beach Road and Jalan Sultan in the west.

As Crawford is located directly adjacent to the Downtown Core, many commercial developments have since sprung up in this area. Landmarks include The Concourse, The Plaza, Golden Mile Complex, St John Headquarters, Masjid Hajjah Fatimah, Kallang Riverside Park and Marina Promenade.

Several blocks of public housing constructed by the Housing and Development Board (HDB) are found along North Bridge Road and Beach Road, where the Kampong Glam Community Club and Kampong Glam Neighbourhood Police Post are situated.

Nicoll Highway MRT station provides Mass Rapid Transit (MRT) access to this subzone.

References

External links

Places in Singapore
Central Region, Singapore
Kallang